WRHL 93.5 FM 1060 AM is a radio station licensed to Rochelle, Illinois. The station serves the Rochelle and DeKalb area and airs a classic hits format of The 70s 80s & 90s, and is owned by Rochelle Broadcasting Company.

History
The station began broadcasting on September 16, 1966, running 250 watts during daytime hours only. The station was originally owned by Tilton Publications. In 1970, the station was sold to Rochelle Broadcasting Company for $130,000. In 1994, the station added nighttime operations, running 20 watts. In 1995, the station's nighttime power was increased to 50 watts.

In 1996, the station switched from country music programming to a talk format. The station was branded "Newstalk 1060 WRHL". On December 28, 2016, after stunting with Christmas music throughout most of the month as "Santa 1060", WRHL flipped to oldies as "Good Time Oldies 1060". The station is retaining its news elements including its full service morning show hosted by Jeff Leon along with Fox Newscasts & Fox News Updates. Kris Wexell Program Director & Operations Manager. WRHL aired Chicago Bears, Chicago Bulls, and Chicago White Sox Sports. As of January 5, 2018 WRHL held a construction permit for a 250-watt FM translator station, W228DT 93.5 MHz.

On February 12, 2020, the AM (and FM simulcast) flipped to a Classic Hits format of music from the late 1960s, 1970s, and 1980s. They kept their on-air staff and branded themselves as "Superhits 93.5". This was the first time that their FM translator was ever promoted, and, furthermore, the station no longer references their AM station except for the top-of-the-hour identification. Under Program Director & Operations Manager Kris Wexell, SuperHits 93.5 has a live morning show with Chuck O'Brien, mid-days with Susan Tyler afternoons with Murphy Sam and Jodi evenings with Rick Dees, and overnights with Tom Kent. SuperHits 93.5 is now affiliated with the CBS Radio Network, no longer airs Chicago sports however remains a Westwood One NFL affiliate. On the first day of 2022, SuperHits 93.5 dropped the 60s from the format, and now features music from the 70s, 80s, & 90s.

Former logo

References

External links
WRHL's website
WRHL's Facebook

RHL
Classic hits radio stations in the United States
Radio stations established in 1966
1966 establishments in Illinois